Danmarks Nationalbank issued a 1000 kroner bank note on 18 September 1998 – updated on 25 November 2004.

The Danish thousand-kroner bill (DKK1000) is a denomination of Danish currency.  Danish artists Anna and Michael Ancher are featured on the front side of the bill.  It is at present the largest denomination in circulation, and the current version came into circulation on 25 November 2004.  The banknote is 165 mm x 72 mm.

The front of the banknote has a double portrait of artists Anna and Michael Ancher (18 August 1859 to 15 April 1935, and 9 June 1849 to 19 September 1927). The couple are known for their paintings depicting everyday life in the fishing town of Skagen. The portraits featured on the banknote were inspired by two paintings by Danish artist Peder Severin Krøyer made in 1884, and originally hung on the walls in the dining room at Brøndums Hotel in Skagen. The anchor background pattern on the banknote does not directly refer to the artists' surname (anker means anchor in Danish), but to a necklace worn by Anna.

The back of the banknote shows a tournament scene from a sepulchral monument in Bislev Church in northern Jutland.

The 1000 kroner bill is sometimes referred to as a tudse (toad), from a word play on the word tusinde (a thousand).

25 November 2004 the Danish national bank improved the security features with a hologram of a palette, the number 1000 and the Roman numeral "M".

References 

 

Banknotes of Denmark
Portraits on banknotes